The OA is an American mystery drama television series with science fiction, supernatural, and fantasy elements. The OA debuted on Netflix on December 16, 2016. Created and executive produced by Brit Marling and Zal Batmanglij, the series is their third collaboration. The series consists of two seasons of eight episodes each, nearly all directed by Batmanglij, and is produced by Plan B Entertainment and Anonymous Content. In the series, Marling stars as a young woman named Prairie Johnson who resurfaces after having been missing for seven years. Prairie now calls herself "the OA" and can see, despite having been blind before her disappearance.

On February 8, 2017, Netflix renewed the series for a second season, dubbed "Part II", that was released on March 22, 2019. Although The OA was planned by its creators to be a five-part story told in five seasons, on August 5, 2019, Netflix canceled the series after two seasons, leaving the show with a cliffhanger ending. The OA received generally favorable critical reception, averaging 77% for Part I and 92% for Part II on Rotten Tomatoes. The series' directing, visuals and acting were often singled out, as was its social impact. It has been listed by many publications as one of the best TV shows of the 2010s, 21st century, and all time.

Synopsis

Part I
The series is about Prairie Johnson, an adopted young woman who resurfaces after having been missing for seven years. Upon her return, Prairie calls herself "the OA" (for "original angel"), has scars on her back, and can see, despite having been blind when she disappeared. The OA refuses to tell the FBI and her adoptive parents where she has been and how her eyesight was restored, and instead quickly assembles a team of five locals (four high school students and a teacher) to whom she reveals that information, also explaining her life story. Finally, she asks for their help to save the other missing people whom she claims she can rescue by opening a portal to another dimension.

Part II
The second season follows the OA as she traverses to another dimension and ends up in San Francisco to continue her search for her former captor Hap and her fellow captives. Prairie crosses paths with private eye Karim Washington and assists in his investigation of the surreal disappearance of a missing girl that involves an abandoned house with a supernatural history and an online puzzle game. Meanwhile, in the original dimension, a series of unfortunate events propels the OA's five companions to embark on a road trip across America to assist the OA on her journey.

Cast
The following actors appear in the series:

Main 
 Brit Marling as Prairie Johnson / the OA / Nina Azarova / "Brit"
 Emory Cohen as Homer Roberts
 Scott Wilson as Abel Johnson, Prairie's adoptive father (season 1, guest season 2)
 Phyllis Smith as Betty "BBA" Broderick-Allen
 Alice Krige as Nancy Johnson, Prairie's adoptive mother (season 1, guest season 2)
 Patrick Gibson as Steve Winchell / "Patrick Gibson"
 Brendan Meyer as Jesse Mills 
 Brandon Perea as Alfonso "French" Sosa
 Ian Alexander as Buck Vu and Michelle Vu (season 2)
 Jason Isaacs as Hunter Aloysius "Hap" Percy / Dr. Percy / "Jason Isaacs"
Kingsley Ben-Adir as Karim Washington (season 2)
 Will Brill as Scott Brown (season 2, recurring season 1)
 Sharon Van Etten as Rachel DeGrasso (season 2, recurring season 1)
 Paz Vega as Renata Duarte (season 2, recurring season 1)
 Chloe Levine as Angie (season 2, recurring season 1)

Guest 
 Hiam Abbass as Khatun (season 1)
 Zoey Todorovsky as Nina Azarova, a young Prairie Johnson
 Marcus Choi as Mr. Vu
 Robert Eli as Ellis Gilchrist, a high school principal (season 1)
 Nikolai Nikolaeff as Roman Azarov, Nina's father 
 Sean Grandillo as Miles Brekov (season 1)
 Rosalind Chao as Patricia Knoller, a Chicago Tribune journalist (season 1)
 Zachary Gemino as Carlos Sosa, Alfonso's brother 
 Harry Hains as Noah
 Riz Ahmed as Elias Rahim, an FBI trauma counselor
 Robert Morgan as Stan Markham, a sheriff (season 1)
 Michael Cumpsty as Leon Citro (season 1)
 Bria Vinaite as Darmi (season 2)
 Zendaya as Fola Uzaki (season 2)
 Zoë Chao as Mo (season 2)
 Irène Jacob as Élodie (season 2)
 Eijiro Ozaki as Azrael / Old Night, a giant octopus (voice) (season 2)
 Vincent Kartheiser as Pierre Ruskin (season 2)
 Liz Carr as Marlow Rhodes (season 2)
 Melora Walters as Melody, who accompanies OA to the clinic in the episode "Angel of Death"

Episodes

Part I (2016)

Part II (2019)

Production
The series was conceived by Brit Marling and Zal Batmanglij and they began working on the concept in December 2012. They spent two years working on The OA on their own, before pitching to studios. From the early stages of development onward, they were telling the story out loud and noting one another's reactions to the story to refine it accordingly. They found it difficult to summarize the series in a written story, so they developed it aurally. When executives read the script of the first hour, they asked if the story "really [went] somewhere". Marling and Batmanglij then began to tell the story from beginning to end, playing all the characters and acting out the big moments through many hours. They worked with Brad Pitt's Plan B Entertainment, which connected with the story and shared notes before it went to networks and studios. Following a multiple-network bidding war, the series was first announced on March 5, 2015, when Netflix ordered eight one-hour long episodes with Plan B and Anonymous Content also on board. The announcement revealed that Marling would star, Batmanglij would direct, and both would write and executive produce. Marling and Batmanglij held similar positions in their previous two collaborations, Sound of My Voice and The East.

Rostam Batmanglij, Zal's brother, worked as one of the composers on the series, and he also wrote its theme music. He previously composed for both Sound of My Voice and The East. Choreographer Ryan Heffington created The Movements, which are inspired by interpretive dance. Heffington first professionally worked with them on The East, and had been an acquaintance of both from earlier than that.

The final chapter of Part I includes a dedication to Allison Wilke. Wilke, also known professionally as A.W. Gryphon, was a producer on the series who died of breast cancer three days after the series was finished and a month before its release.

Cancellation and fan response
On August 5, 2019, despite the generally positive reception to the show, Netflix canceled the series after two seasons, leaving the show with a cliffhanger ending. Marling wrote that she and Batmanglij were "deeply sad" that they would not be able to finish the show. Fans responded with a #SaveTheOA and #TheOAisReal campaign on Twitter, a Change.org petition, and by posting video of themselves performing The Movements from the show. Additionally, the OA fan base raised funds for a digital billboard in Times Square. Marling wrote that she was moved by the fan support. One fan went on a hunger strike outside Netflix's Los Angeles Headquarters to protest for the show's return; Marling and Batmanglij visited her and offered her food and water. Some fans online put forward a theory that the cancellation announcement was just a meta publicity stunt. Prominent creators of other television series also expressed their love for The OA, including Shonda Rhimes, Sam Esmail and Alex Kurtzman.

Reception

Critical response
In 2021, The OA was named the seventh best TV show of all time by Empire. BBC listed it as one of the 100 greatest TV series of the 21st century at number 88. The series was also listed by several publications as one of the best TV shows of the 2010s. NME named it the 20th best TV show of the decade, while Wired listed it as the sixth best. Collider also included the series on its unranked "60 Best TV Shows of the Decade" list.

Part I 
Part I of The OA garnered a polarized but generally positive response from critics. Rotten Tomatoes assigned the first season a 77% critical approval rating and an average rating of 7.59/10 based on 66 reviews, writing that "The OA is more than OK." Metacritic, based on 17 reviews, assigned the series a rating of 61 out of 100, indicating "generally favorable reviews". Most reviewers acknowledged the series' ambition and praised its mystery and direction. Reviewers made both favorable and unfavorable comparisons to another Netflix Original, Stranger Things.

John Doyle of The Globe and Mail wrote, "The OA is Netflix's strongest and strangest original production since Stranger Things. In terms of substantive, original drama, it transcends it. Mind you, it is unclassifiable in the context of drama, mystery, science-fiction and fantasy, since it is straddling all sorts of lines and blurring them. It is outright astounding and brilliant, too." Tim Surette at TV Guide said that "the final moments of Episode 5 – probably the best episode of the first season – was some of the most reaffirming television I've ever seen, not just for the show but for life itself. I've never really had this kind of a relationship with a series while watching it, but it's that experience that makes it well worth viewing." New York Magazines review was entitled "Netflix's The OA Is an Extraordinary, Binge-Worthy December Surprise".

Tristram Fane Saunders of The Daily Telegraph gave a mixed review of 3 out of 5 stars and noted the series' potential but criticized its similarity to fellow Netflix Original Stranger Things, claiming that the series was attempting to be "stranger than Stranger Things but "on the basis of the first four episodes, the answer is a resounding no". Saunders's review also highlighted the series' lack of originality and characterization, and derided the dialogue as "portentous [and] self-consciously literary". It also criticized the slow pace as "glacial". However, Saunders also acknowledged the series told an interesting and compelling story, writing that "The OA may be utter hokum, but you'll still be hooked." Daniel Fienberg of The Hollywood Reporter gave a negative review, stating that the series was "a failed, but not wholly worthless, experiment in TV auteurism". Fienberg added "the problem, of course, is that telling you what The OA is vaguely like is just another tease and telling you what it actually is is a recipe for disappointment, because after an enticing and somewhat infuriating build-up, The OA becomes something quite ludicrous as it stumbles toward a climax that is, if I'm generous, merely unearned and if I'm not being generous, a series of offensive overreaches."

Variety published diverging opinions about the series: its TV critic at the time, Sonia Saraiya, gave the show a mixed review that praised the direction and acting but opined that overall "it is hard to take The OA seriously", detailing that "none of it makes any sense", and concluded that "[a]s an exercise in vision, The OA is exciting. As that other thing — a television show — it’s an especially cryptic attempt to say very little of consequence.". A few days later, on the other hand, the magazine's chief film critic Peter Debruge wrote an extremely positive column with the headline "Why The OA is One of the Year's Most Important Films", stating that the show's first season had "the most effective ending [he had] ever seen in a TV series", and that its "final twist [...] left [him] crying uncontrollably for nearly half an hour".

Part II 
Part II received very positive reviews upon its release. On Rotten Tomatoes, the second season has an approval rating of 92% based on 36 reviews, with an average rating of 7.7/10. The website's critical consensus reads, "The OA second season provides satisfying answers to its predecessors' most maddening enigmas, all while maintaining the singular ambience that fans have come to crave." On Metacritic, it has a weighted average score of 70 out of 100, based on 6 critics, indicating "generally favorable reviews". Critics particularly praised its surrealism, directing and acting.

Empire crowned The OA the best television series of 2019 (so far) in September 2019. The Playlist stated in their review that: "The OA: Part II packs each frame so dense with detail, that not one second of the new season's more-than-eight-hour runtime seems wasted, expositional, cheap, or unearned." Jesse Scheden of IGN gave The OA: Part II a score of 8.8 out of 10, saying the season is "bigger, more ambitious and much weirder than its predecessor". Rachel Syme in The New Republic praised the season, labeling the show as "the best, most inaccessible show on television", saying that "[she wishes] more television was this unafraid to leave its audiences fumbling for understanding."

Daniel Fienberg of The Hollywood Reporter wrote: "The only thing I'm sure of when it comes to The OA is that the process of watching and experiencing an episode is unlike the viewing of any other show on TV and, good or bad, there's value in that." Alex McLevy of The A.V. Club echoed that sentiment, saying "sacrificing your expectations of plausibility feels like a worthwhile price of admission." Jen Chaney of New York Magazine called the season a mind-bender and praised the way it depicted the aftermath of a school shooting.

Ed Power of The Daily Telegraph, gave it 4 out of 5 stars, and wrote that the show "truly comes into its own when you stop attempting to piece together the storyline and instead submit to Marling and Batmanglij's vision." Emily VanDerWerff of Vox, initially critical of the first season, wrote of the series: "over time, I kept thinking about it ... until I convinced myself that The OA is kind of genius, while simultaneously being incredibly silly". Haleigh Foutch of Collider said, "Netflix has carved out a space for itself as a home for innovative genre storytelling, and The OA might just be their crowning achievement in that regard."

Accolades

The OA was nominated at the 2017 GLAAD Media Awards as Outstanding Drama Series. Brit Marling and Zal Batmanglij were nominated for a Writers Guild of America Award for Episodic Drama in 2018 for the episode "Homecoming". Paz Vega was nominated in the Best Female Performance in an International Production category of the 29th Actors and Actresses Union Awards in 2020.

References

External links

2010s American LGBT-related drama television series
2010s American drama television series
2010s American mystery television series
2010s American science fiction television series
2016 American television series debuts
2019 American television series endings
Television shows about death
Fiction about near-death experiences
English-language Netflix original programming
Nonlinear narrative television series
Science fantasy television series
Serial drama television series
Surrealist television series
Television series about dysfunctional families
Television series about missing people
Television series about parallel universes
Television series by Anonymous Content
Television shows about disability
Television shows set in Michigan
Television shows set in San Francisco
Transgender-related television shows
Works about existentialism
LGBT speculative fiction television series